The Musafir Khana Palace also known as the Musafirkana Palace was built in Cairo, Egypt between 1779 and 1788 by Mahmud Muharram; a wealthy merchant.  Muhammad Ali Pasha bought the palace in early 19th century to use as a royal guesthouse.  It was the birthplace of his grandson Khedive Ismai'l 1830-1895. In 1998, it burned to the ground.  It was an excellent example of the Ottoman Style.

See also 
 List of palaces in Egypt

References 
 archnet.org Musafirkhana Palace
 google books Islamic Monuments in Cairo - Parker, Sabin, and Williams
 Mit.edu Pictures of Palace

Palaces in Cairo
History of Cairo
Muhammad Ali dynasty